Toby Peter Sibbick (born 23 May 1999) is an English footballer who plays for Scottish Premiership club Heart of Midlothian. Mainly utilised as a defender, Sibbick has also been used as a wing-back and a central midfielder.

He has previously played for AFC Wimbledon and Barnsley, as well as spending a short spell on loan at Hearts before signing permanently.

Early life
Born in Isleworth to a Ugandan mother and an English father, Sibbick grew up in Feltham, West London.

He started playing football when his father took him to play for Feltham Youth, before later joining Conquest Football Academy. Sibbick gained a trial for AFC Wimbledon after playing against them and then subsequently being scouted.

Career

AFC Wimbledon and early career 
After being scouted, Sibbick signed his first professional contract with AFC Wimbledon, and made his professional debut on 17 April 2017 in a 0–0 draw against Peterborough United.

He scored his first goals for Wimbledon when he scored twice in an EFL Trophy tie against Tottenham Hotspur Under-23s on 3 October 2017. On 26 January 2019, Sibbick came off the bench scored the fourth goal against West Ham United in the FA Cup fourth round to seal a famous 4–2 win for AFC Wimbledon.

Barnsley 
Sibbick signed for Barnsley in the summer of 2019. He then moved on loan to Scottish club Heart of Midlothian in January 2020.

On 4 August 2020, Sibbick joined Belgian First Division A side Oostende on a season-long loan deal, which was eventually terminated early in December 2020 as Sibbick had difficulties manifesting himself due to the good performance of other young defenders.

He scored his first goal for Barnsley in a 1–1 draw with Cardiff City on 7 August 2021.

Heart of Midlothian 
On 27 January 2022, Sibbick signed with previous loan club Heart of Midlothian on a three-and-a-half year deal for an undisclosed fee. He made his second debut for Hearts in a 2–0 home win against Motherwell two days later, coming on at half time to replace an injured John Souttar.

Style of play
Sibbick is well known for his versatility, work-rate, and fitness levels, in mainly defending but also the attacking sense. He can operate in mainly defensive positions but has the footballing ability to play further forward if needed. He has been described as: "So comfortable on the ball, as he can also get up and down the pitch brilliantly" and "tall, athletic and has the ability to easily beat his man and find a teammate".

Career statistics

References

External links

Living people
1999 births
Footballers from Isleworth
English footballers
English people of Ugandan descent
AFC Wimbledon players
English Football League players
Association football defenders
Barnsley F.C. players
Heart of Midlothian F.C. players
K.V. Oostende players
Scottish Professional Football League players
English expatriate footballers
Expatriate footballers in Belgium